Jacques Pépin (born December 18, 1935) is a French chef, author, culinary educator, television personality, and artist.  After having been the personal chef of French President Charles de Gaulle, he moved to the US in 1959 and after working in New York's top French restaurants, refused the same job with President John F. Kennedy in the White House and instead took a culinary development job with Howard Johnson's. During his career, he has served in numerous prestigious restaurants, first, in Paris, and then in America. He has appeared on American television and has written for The New York Times, Food & Wine and other publications. He has authored over 30 cookbooks, some of which have become best sellers. Pépin was a longtime friend of the American chef Julia Child, and their 1999 PBS series Julia and Jacques Cooking at Home won a Daytime Emmy Award. He also holds a BA and a MA from Columbia University in French literature.

He has been honored with 24 James Beard Foundation Awards, five honorary doctoral degrees, the American Public Television's lifetime achievement award, the Emmy Award for Lifetime Achievement in 2019 and the Légion d'honneur, France's highest order of merit, in 2004.

Since 1989, Pépin has taught in the Culinary Arts Program at Boston University and served as dean of special programs at the International Culinary Center in New York City. In 2016, with his daughter, Claudine Pépin and his son-in-law, Rollie Wesen, Pépin created the Jacques Pépin Foundation to support culinary education for adults with barriers to employment. He has lived in Connecticut since 1975.

Early years

Pépin was born in 1935 in Bourg-en-Bresse, France. Pépin was the second of three sons born to Jeannette and Jean-Victor Pépin. After World War II, his parents opened a restaurant called Le Pélican, where Pépin worked as a child, and later became known for his love for food. At the age of thirteen, he started his apprenticeship at Le Grand Hôtel de l'Europe in Bourg-en-Bresse. At age sixteen, he went on to work in Paris, training under Lucien Diat at the Plaza Athénée. From 1956 to 1958, during his military service, Pépin was recognized for his culinary training and skill and was ordered to work in the Office of the Treasury, where he met his long-time cooking partner, Jean-Claude Szurdak, and eventually became the personal chef to three French heads of state, including Charles de Gaulle.

In 1959, Pépin went to the United States to work at the restaurant Le Pavillon. Wanting to complete his education, he enrolled in English for foreign students, a GED equivalent and eventually General Studies classes toward a Bachelor of Arts degree at Columbia University. Soon after his arrival, The New York Times food editor Craig Claiborne introduced Pépin to James Beard and Helen McCully. McCully introduced Pépin to Julia Child, who became a lifelong friend and collaborator. In 1961, after Pépin had declined an offer from John F. Kennedy and Jacqueline Kennedy to serve as chef at the White House, Howard Johnson, a regular Le Pavillon customer, hired him to work alongside fellow Frenchman Pierre Franey to develop food lines for his chain of Howard Johnson's restaurants, where Pépin served as the director of research and development for a decade. In 1970, Pépin earned his Bachelor of Arts from Columbia University's School of General Studies, and in 1972, his Masters of Arts in French literature from the Columbia Graduate School of Arts and Sciences. Pépin entered into a doctoral program at Columbia, but his proposed thesis on French food in literature was rejected for being "too frivolous for serious academic pursuit" (Pépin, para. 3).

In 1970, Pépin opened a specialty soup restaurant and lunch counter on Manhattan's 5th Avenue called La Potagerie, and began to enjoy popular success with appearances on talk shows such as What's My Line? and To Tell the Truth. Pépin's career as a restaurant chef ended abruptly with a near fatal car accident in 1974.

Middle career 

Beginning in the mid-1970s, Pépin reinvented himself as an educator, author and eventually a television personality. Pépin worked as a consultant for restaurateur Joe Baum on his Windows on the World project, and offered classes at small cooking schools and cookware shops around the United States. In 1976, Pépin authored his cookbook La Technique, followed by La Methode in 1979. The use of thousands of photographs, illustrating the techniques and methods required to achieve certain culinary results, provided a window into the art of cooking. The books are credited by chef Tom Colicchio and others as helping them to learn the craft of cooking.

In 1982, along with Alain Sailhac and André Soltner, Pépin was invited by Dorothy Cann Hamilton to become one of the deans at the newly formed culinary school, the French Culinary Institute, in New York City, now known as the International Culinary Center (ICC). Also in 1982, he filmed his first television series, with PBS local station WJCT-TV in Jacksonville, Florida, and published a companion cookbook entitled Everyday Cooking with Jacques Pépin. Through the 1980s and into the 1990s, Pépin was published as a columnist for The New York Times, and a guest author for Gourmet, Food & Wine and many others. He authored several more cookbooks, including The Art of Cooking, volumes 1 and 2, and The Short-Cut Cook.

In 1989, Pépin partnered with Julia Child and Rebecca Alssid to create a culinary certificate program within the Metropolitan College at Boston University (BU). This effort eventually led to the first, and still one of the few, Master's degrees in Gastronomy. Pépin's 1991 television series Today’s Gourmet, filmed at KQED studios in San Francisco was created from recipes from several books, brought together in the companion cookbook Jacques Pépin's Table. In 1994 and 1996, Pepin and Julia Child appeared in 90 minute PBS specials, Cooking In Concert and More Cooking In Concert, filmed live before a Boston audience as part of the PBS annual fund drives for those years. In 1996, Pépin introduced his then 27-year-old daughter Claudine, in three television series and companion books: Cooking with Claudine, Encore with Claudine and Jacques Pépin Celebrates. The father to daughter relationship, combined with an instructor to culinary novice relationship, demonstrated Pépin's work as a chef and teacher. Each of the three series earned the pair James Beard Foundation Awards. In 1999, Pépin teamed up with Julia Child for the series and companion book Jacques and Julia Cooking at Home. The TV series, produced by Susie Heller, won a Daytime Emmy Award and a James Beard Foundation Award. In 2003, Pépin published his autobiography, The Apprentice: My Life in the Kitchen.

Later career 

In the 21st century, Pépin continues to cook, write, publish, film for television, paint and take on new projects. Throughout his career, he has toured and taught on cruise ships including the Queen Elizabeth 2, and the Crystal Cruises and Princess Cruises lines. In 2003, he was named the executive culinary director of Oceania Cruises, and "is credited with helping it achieve its reputation for culinary excellence and style". Pépin continues to teach at the ICC and at BU, and offers book signings, culinary demonstrations and classes on Oceania cruises and at various locations across the US, several times per year.

Since his time as a student at Columbia University, Pépin has dabbled in and enjoyed drawing and painting. In recent years, he has committed more time to his art, and enjoyed some success with commercial sales on his website, Jacques Pépin Art, and juried shows. In the first decade of the 2000s, Pépin published several more cookbooks including Fast Food My Way and More Fast Food My Way, which were paired with television series of the same name, produced by Tina Salter, and Chez Jacques: Traditions and Rituals of a Cook, that significantly featured Pépin's art. In 2011, Pépin filmed the series Essential Pépin at KQED studios and published a companion cookbook with over 700 recipes and a set of technique-oriented videos. In 2012, he published New Complete Techniques, which combined and updated his important earlier works La Technique and La Methode.

In 2015 Pépin, 79, recovered at his home in Connecticut after suffering a minor stroke. He canceled his appearance at the annual International Association of Culinary Professionals conference in Washington D.C., but otherwise insisted on returning to his normal schedule, according to the Associated Press. "Oh my god, he made soup this morning", Pépin's daughter Claudine told the Associated Press. "I will do my best to lighten the load, but he's not of the mind to cancel anything. Honestly, he wanted to go to IACP. He's like, 'I'm talking. I can walk. Let's go.

In 2016, with his daughter Claudine Pépin and son-in-law Rollie Wesen, Jacques created his eponymous, non-profit, organization the Jacques Pépin Foundation (JPF). The mission of the foundation is to support organizations that provide culinary training to adults and youths with barriers to employment such as low-income, low-skills, homelessness, issues with substance abuse and previous incarceration. The JPF provides grants, independent research, source and curricular materials, equipment, direct teaching and video instruction to community-based culinary training programs around the USA.

In 2017, Pépin published a cookbook with his granddaughter Shorey Wesen, entitled A Grandfather's Lessons. In the same year, Pépin received an honorary doctorate from the Columbia University School of General Studies. Pépin resided in Connecticut with his wife Gloria, until her death in 2020.

Television

The success of Pépin's book La Technique, used as a textbook for teaching the fundamentals of French cuisine, prompted him to launch a televised version resulting in a 1997 PBS series, The Complete Pépin. Relaunched on PBS ten years after its initial run, the series included a new introduction by Pépin where he stressed that the secret to being a successful chef and not a mere line cook lies in knowing and using the proper technique.

In 1999, Pépin co-starred in the PBS series Julia and Jacques Cooking at Home alongside Julia Child. The program was awarded a Daytime Emmy in 2001.

His show Jacques Pépin: Fast Food My Way (based on his 2004 book of the same name) ran on PBS, and Jacques Pépin: More Fast Food My Way was broadcast on PBS' Create. In Essential Pépin (2011), Pépin brings modern touches to some of his favorite recipes from his career. In the 26-part public television series, Pépin demonstrates more than 125 dishes while the companion book, published by Houghton-Mifflin, contains more than 700 recipes. In this series, Pépin cooks with his daughter, Claudine, wife of chef Rolland Wesen. All of his programs have been produced by KQED-TV in San Francisco.

Pépin was a guest judge on season five of the Bravo television show Top Chef, which aired in 2008. He stated that his ideal "final meal" would be roast squab and fresh peas.

Pépin was a guest on the television show Wahlburgers episode called "Pauli Day". Donnie Wahlberg arranged for Pépin to surprise his brother Paul Wahlberg for his birthday.

In 2015, his television series Jacques Pépin Heart & Soul began airing. According to its producer, Tina Salter KQED-TV, the series would be his "most personal and special, revealing a man – a legend – whose lust for life, love of food, family and friends continues". The series premiered on KQED on September 12, 2015, and nationally on September 19.

A documentary about his life, Jacques Pépin: The Art of Craft, aired as part of the PBS series American Masters, premiering May 26, 2017. The film, narrated by Stanley Tucci, was produced and directed by Peter L. Stein, who had produced several of Pépin's early television cooking series at KQED in the 1990s.

Awards and honors

In addition to the Daytime Emmy Award won with Julia Child, Pépin has received three of the French government's honors: He is a Chevalier de L'Ordre des Arts et des Lettres (1997) and a Chevalier de L'Ordre du Mérite Agricole (1992). In October 2004, he received France's Légion d'honneur. He has also received 24 James Beard Foundation awards.

On May 13, 2010, Pépin, along with other chefs from the French Culinary Institute (known as the International Culinary Center), Alain Sailhac, Jacques Torres and André Soltner, prepared a $30,000-per-couple dinner for President Barack Obama's fund-raiser for the Democratic Congressional Campaign Committee at Manhattan's St. Regis Hotel.

On February 5, 2010, during the christening of MS Marina, Pépin was named an honorary commodore of the Oceania Cruises fleet, for which he serves as Executive Culinary Director.

He received an honorary doctorate of Humane Letters from Boston University on May 22, 2011. In October 2011, Pépin was the recipient of the first-ever tribute dinner at the New York Food and Wine Festival. Cooking for Pépin at the event, hosted by Martha Stewart, were French chefs Alain Ducasse, Daniel Boulud, and others. In 2015, Pépin was the first recipient of the Julia Child Award from The Julia Child Foundation for Gastronomy and the Culinary Arts.

In May 2017, Pépin received an honorary doctorate of Humane Letters from Columbia University.

Personal life

Pépin married Gloria Evelyn Augier in 1966, whom he met while working as a ski instructor. She died on December 5, 2020. They had one daughter, Claudine (b. 1967).

In 1974, Pépin was badly injured while driving on a country road when a deer leapt in front of his car and he swerved to avoid it. His car hit the deer, veered off the road, struck a telephone pole, then crashed into a ravine and landed upside-down and on fire. He fractured 14 bones in his back, pelvis, and arms. His left arm was so badly injured that physicians initially wanted to amputate it. Pépin recovered, but his left shoulder remained limited in mobility and his left arm is several inches shorter than his right. In his autobiography, "The Apprentice: My Life in the Kitchen"  Pepin notes that his accident caused him to realize that he would not be able to continue working full-time as a chef/restaurateur; this realization motivated his reinvention as a teacher and author.

Bibliography

The Other Half of the Egg (1967) (with Helen McCully and William North Jayme)
Jacques Pépin: A French Chef Cooks at Home (1975)
La Technique (1976)
La Methode (1979)
Everyday Cooking With Jacques Pépin (1982)
The Art of Cooking, Vol 1 (1987)
The Art of Cooking, Vol 2 (1988)
Short-Cut Cook (1990)
Today's Gourmet (1991)
Cuisine Economique (1992)
Today's Gourmet II (1992)
Jacques Pépin's Simple and Healthy Cooking (1994)
Jacques Pépin's Table (1995)
Jacques Pépin's Kitchen: Cooking with Claudine (1996)
The Complete Pépin (1997)
The French Culinary Institute's Salute to Healthy Cooking (1998) (with Alain Sailhac, Andre Soltner, and Jacques Torres)
Jacques Pépin's Kitchen: Encore with Claudine (1998)
Julia and Jacques: Cooking at Home (1999) (with Julia Child and David Nussbaum)
Jacques Pépin Celebrates (2001)
The Apprentice: My Life in the Kitchen (2003)
Fast Food My Way (2004)
Chez Jacques: Traditions and Rituals of a Cook (with Tom Hopkins, 2007)
More Fast Food My Way (2008)
Essential Pépin (2011)
New Complete Techniques (2012)
Jacques Pépin: Heart & Soul in the Kitchen (2015)
A Grandfather's Lessons: In the Kitchen with Shorey (2017)
Poulets & Légumes (2018)
Jacques Pépin Quick & Simple (2020)
Jacques Pépin Art of the Chicken: A Master Chef's Paintings, Stories, and Recipes of the Humble Bird (2022)

References

External links

Official website
The International Culinary Center
Pépin's Howard Johnson's Apprenticeship
Jacques Pépin Celebrates
KQED: Jacques Pépin: Fast Food My Way
KQED: Jacques Pépin: More Fast Food My Way
KQED: About Pépin Heart & Soul
KQED: Pépin Heart & Soul Recipes 
Jacques Pépin, "Executive Culinary Director" at Oceania Cruises
Boston University Gastronomy

 

1935 births
Living people
People from Bourg-en-Bresse
American food writers
American television chefs
American male chefs
Columbia University School of General Studies alumni
Boston University faculty
French chefs
French food writers
People from Madison, Connecticut
Knights of the Order of Agricultural Merit
French male non-fiction writers
Television in the San Francisco Bay Area
James Beard Foundation Award winners